Alaverdi Ramazanov (Russian: Алаверди Рамазанов; born November 29, 1994) is a Russian Muay Thai kickboxer who is currently signed to ONE Championship. He is the former inaugural  ONE Bantamweight Kickboxing World Champion. Ramazanov is also a former 3-time IFMA Muay Thai World Champion and 12-time Russian national Muay Thai champion. As of October 6, 2022, he is ranked #2 in the ONE Bantamweight Muay Thai rankings and As of November 24, 2022, he is ranked #2 in the ONE Bantamweight Kickboxing rankings.

Background
Growing up in Dagestan, Ramazanov initially participated in competitive swimming. However, at the age of 13, he turned his attention to Muay Thai.

Muay Thai career
Alaverdi Ramazanov made his Muay Thai debut at the age of 18. He moved to Thailand at 21 to train with the Venum Training Camp in order to develop his Muay Thai skills.

ONE Championship

Early ONE career
Ramazanov made his ONE debut at ONE Championship: Kingdom of Heroes on October 6, 2018 against the heavily favored Phetmorakot Petchyindee Academy. Despite receiving a cut on the back of his head, Ramazanov outstruck Phetmorakot and fought on to claim the unanimous decision victory.

He then faced Andrew Miller at ONE Championship: Heart of the Lion on November 9, 2018. Ramazanov made quick work of the Scotsman with a 57-second, first-round knockout. Ramazanov's KO of Miller stood as a ONE Super Series record for fastest knockout until Kohei "Momotaro" Kodera's 41-second knockout of Singtongnoi Por.Telakun at ONE Championship: Immortal Triumph on September 6, 2019.

Only two weeks later, Ramazanov stepped in on short notice to face Saemapetch Fairtex at ONE Championship: Conquest of Champions on November 23, 2018. Despite keeping the fight close and competitive, Ramazanov lost the fight by unanimous decision.

On February 16, 2019, Alaverdi Ramazanov faced Kongsak P.K. SaenchaiMuaythaiGym at ONE Championship: Clash of Legends. Once again, Ramazanov was able to keep the fight close but ultimately lost via split decision.

Nevertheless, Ramazanov would bounce back as he faced Serbian-American veteran Ognjen Topic at ONE Championship: Dreams of Gold on August 16, 2019. Alaverdi Ramazanov came out strong and was able to knock down Topic three times within the first round, claiming the decisive TKO victory.

ONE Bantamweight title reign
His win over Ognjen Topic would set him up for a title shot against Zhang Chenglong for the inaugural ONE Bantamweight Kickboxing World Championship at ONE Championship: Mark Of Greatness on December 6, 2019. Despite having mostly fought under Muay Thai rules and showing signs of slowing down in the later rounds, Alaverdi Ramazanov was able to adapt and scored a crucial knockdown before winning the fight by unanimous decision, becoming the first ONE Bantamweight Kickboxing World Champion.

Alaverdi Ramazanov was scheduled to defend his ONE Bantamweight Kickboxing World title against the reigning ONE Bantamweight Muay Thai World Champion Nong-O Gaiyanghadao at ONE Championship: Heart of Heroes on March 20, 2020. He had previously expressed interest in a fight with Nong-O. However, their fight never materialized and the event was cancelled as a result of the COVID-19 pandemic.

Ramazanov was scheduled to make his first title defense against Capitan Petchyindee Academy at ONE Championship: Unbreakable. On January 22, 2021, Ramazanov lost the title to Capitan by second-round knockout via leg kicks.

Post-title reign
Ramazanov is scheduled to return against former ONE Featherweight Muay Thai title challenger Pongsiri P.K.Saenchaimuaythaigym at ONE Championship: NextGen III on November 26, 2021. He won the fight by split decision.

Ramazanov faced Capitan Petchyindee Academy at ONE 161 on September 29, 2022. He won the close bout via split decision.

Ramazanov was scheduled to face Nong-O Gaiyanghadao for the ONE Bantamweight Muay Thai World Championship on January 14, 2023, at ONE Fight Night 6. However, the bout was moved to headline at ONE Friday Fights 1 on January 20. He lost the bout via knockout in the third round.

Ramazanov faced Mavlud Tupiev on March 10, 2023, at ONE Friday Fights 8. He lost the fight via unanimous decision.

Titles and accomplishments
 ONE Championship
 2019 ONE Bantamweight Kickboxing World Champion
 International Federation of Muaythai Amateur 
 IFMA Muay Thai World Champion 
 IFMA Muay Thai European Champion
 Russian Muaythai Federation 
 12× Russian National (Russian Muaythai Federation) Muay Thai Champion

Awards
 2019 Orion Awards Fighter of the Year

Fight record

|-  style="background:#fbb;"
| 2023-03-10|| Loss ||align=left| Mavlud Tupiev  ||  ONE Friday Fights 8, Lumpinee Stadium || Bangkok, Thailand || Decision (Unanimous)  ||3   ||3:00 
|-  style="background:#fbb;"
| 2023-01-20|| Loss ||align=left| Nong-O Gaiyanghadao ||  ONE Friday Fights 1, Lumpinee Stadium || Bangkok, Thailand || KO (Body punch)  || 3  || 2:12
|-  style="background:#CCFFCC;"
! style=background:white colspan=9 |
|-  style="background:#CCFFCC;"
| 2022-09-29 || Win ||align=left| Capitan Petchyindee Academy || ONE 161 || Kallang, Singapore || Decision (Split) || 3 || 3:00  
|-
|-  style="background:#CCFFCC;"
| 2021-11-26|| Win ||align=left| Pongsiri P.K.Saenchaimuaythaigym || ONE Championship: NextGen III|| Kallang, Singapore || KO (Punch) || 1 || 2:39
|-  style="background:#fbb;"
| 2021-01-22|| Loss ||align=left| Capitan Petchyindee Academy || ONE Championship: Unbreakable || Kallang, Singapore || KO (Leg kick + right cross) || 2 || 1:56  
|-
! style=background:white colspan=9 |
|-
|-  style="background:#CCFFCC;"
| 2019-12-06|| Win ||align=left| Zhang Chenglong || ONE Championship: Mark Of Greatness || Kuala Lumpur, Malaysia || Decision (Unanimous) || 5 || 3:00
|-
! style=background:white colspan=9 |
|-  style="background:#CCFFCC;"
| 2019-08-16|| Win ||align=left| Ognjen Topic|| ONE Championship: Dreams of Gold ||Bangkok, Thailand|| TKO (3 Knockdown Rule) || 1 || 2:25
|-  style="background:#fbb;"
| 2019-02-16 || Loss ||align=left| Kongsak P.K. SaenchaiMuaythaiGym  || ONE Championship: Clash of Legends || Bangkok, Thailand || Decision (Split)  || 3 || 3:00
|-  style="background:#fbb;"
|2018-11-23 || Loss ||align=left| Saemapetch Fairtex || ONE Championship: Conquest of Champions  || Pasay, Philippines || Decision (Unanimous) || 3 || 3:00
|-  style="background:#CCFFCC;"
| 2018-11-09 || Win ||align=left| Andrew Miller || ONE Championship: Heart of the Lion || Kallang, Singapore || TKO (Punches) || 1 || 0:57
|-  style="background:#CCFFCC;"
| 2018-10-06 || Win || align="left" | Phetmorakot Wor. Sangprapai || ONE Championship: Kingdom of Heroes || Bangkok, Thailand || Decision (Unanimous)|| 3 || 3:00

|-  style="background:#fbb;"
| 2018-05-06 || Loss ||align=left| Jarwdjew Singnakonkui ||  Real Hero Tournament, Quarter Finals || Bangkok, Thailand || Decision || 3 || 3:00 

|-  style="background:#fbb;"
| 2018-04-08 || Loss ||align=left| Celestin Mendes ||  Duel 3 || Paris, France || Decision || 5 || 3:00  
|-
|-  style="background:#fbb;"
| 2018-01-28 || Loss ||align=left| Beerthai Por Yuttapoom ||  MAX Muay Thai|| Pattaya, Thailand || Decision  || 3 || 3:00
|-  style="background:#cfc;"
| 2017-12-16 || Win||align=left| Islem Hamech || La Nuit Des Challenges 17 ||  France || Decision || 5 || 3:00
|-  style="background:#CCFFCC;"
| 2017-12-03 || Win ||align=left| Tungngern Aot Bor Tor Tasala || MAX Muay Thai||Pattaya, Thailand || KO || 3 ||
|-  style="background:#CCFFCC;"
| 2017-10-28 || Win ||align=left| Aiman Al Radhi || Duel 2 || Paris, France || Decision || 3 || 3:00
|-  style="background:#CCFFCC;"
| 2017-05-18 || Win ||align=left| Kamal Aousti || Boxing Event || Sarcelles, France || Decision || 3 || 3:00
|-  style="background:#CCFFCC;"
| 2017-03-01 || Win ||align=left| Praganchai || MC Fight || Thailand || KO || 1 ||
|-  style="background:#CCFFCC;"
| 2016-05-08 || Win ||align=left| Wuttichai Sor Jor Piaktapong || MAX Muay Thai|| Pattaya, Thailand || Decision || 3 || 3:00
|-  style="background:#CCFFCC;"
| 2016-04-17 || Win ||align=left| Jimmy Sitmonchai || MAX Muay Thai|| Pattaya, Thailand || Decision || 3 || 3:00
|-  style="background:#fbb;"
| 2016-02-16 || Loss ||align=left| Jodan || Lumpinee Stadium || Bangkok, Thailand || Decision || 5 || 3:00
|-  style="background:#fbb;"
| 2015-12-26 || Loss ||align=left| Somboun Vongsa || Super Muaythai || Bangkok, Thailand || Decision || 3 || 3:00
|-
| colspan=9 | Legend:

See also
 List of male kickboxers

References

External links
 Alaverdi Ramazanov at ONE Championship 
 Alaverdi Ramazanov at MuayThaiTV.com
 Instagram

Living people
Russian male kickboxers
Welterweight kickboxers
Russian Muay Thai practitioners
Russian people of Dagestani descent
1994 births
ONE Championship kickboxers
Sportspeople from Dagestan
ONE Championship champions